John Price may refer to:

Sportsmen
Jack Price (Australian footballer) (1901–1941), Australian rules footballer for Hawthorn
Jack Price (rugby league), rugby league footballer of the 1920s for Great Britain, England, Broughton Rangers, and Wigan
John Price (Australian footballer) (born 1944), Australian rules footballer for Hawthorn
John Price (bowls) (born 1960), Welsh lawn and indoor bowler
John Price (cricketer, born 1908) (1908–1995), English cricketer
John Price (cricketer, born 1937), English cricketer, played in 15 Tests, 1964–1972
John Price (footballer, born 1854) (1854–1907), Welsh international footballer
John Price (footballer, born 1936), Welsh footballer with Liverpool, Aston Villa, Walsall and Shrewsbury Town
John Price (sailor) (1920–1991), American Olympic sailor
John B. Price (1883–1954), American football coach in the United States
Johnny Price (1943–1995), English footballer with Burnley, Stockport County and Blackburn Rovers
Johnny Price (Fulham footballer), footballer who played as a half back
Jon Price (born 1973), American sports gambler

Politicians
John Price (MP for Liskeard), in 1402, MP for Liskeard
John Price (MP for Cardiganshire) (died 1584), Welsh politician
John Price (died 1555) (1502–1555), MP for Breconshire, Hereford, Ludlow and Ludgershall
John Price (died 1602), Welsh politician
John Price (MP for Flint Boroughs) (?1570–1656), MP for Flint Boroughs
John Price (MP for Cardiff), Welsh politician who sat in the House of Commons between 1654 and 1659
John Price (New South Wales politician) (born 1939), Australian politician, state parliamentary member for Waratah and Maitland, New South Wales
John Price (South Australian politician) (1882–1941), Australian politician and MHR for Boothby, South Australia
John Price (Canadian politician) (1883–1956), Canadian politician, member of the Legislative Assembly of British Columbia
John Giles Price (1808–1857), magistrate and penal administrator, commandant of second convict settlement at Norfolk Island, 1846–1853
John Price (diplomat) (born 1934), former United States Ambassador to Mauritius and the Seychelles
John Playfair Price (1905–1988), British diplomat
John Wiley Price (born 1950), politician in Dallas, Texas

Actors
John Price (1943–1987), English actor in Sam
John Price (Danish actor) (1913–1996), Danish actor

Scholars
John Price (Welsh scholar) (1502–1555), author of the first book to be printed in Welsh
John Price (classical scholar) (1602–1676), classical scholar, publisher and collector of books

Other people
 John Price, the African American man of the 1858 Oberlin–Wellington Rescue
John Price (British Army officer) (died 1747), general
John Price (executioner) (c. 1677–1718), English executioner
John Price (librarian) (1735–1813), Welsh librarian and Anglican priest
John Arthur Price (1861–1942), British barrister
John Charles Price, British judge
John Charles Thomas Price (1955–2000), Australian murder victim stabbed to death by Katherine Knight in a particularly brutal crime
John D. Price (1892–1957), admiral in the United States Navy
John E. Price (1827–1906), minister of African Methodist Episcopal Zion Church
John Elwood Price (1935–1995), African-American composer, pianist, ethnomusicologist and music teacher
Frederick Price (civil servant) (John Frederick Price, 1839–1927), Indian civil servant and translator
John G. Price (1871–1930), Republican lawyer from the U. S. State of Ohio who served as Ohio Attorney General, 1919–1923
John MacNeile Price, Surveyor General of Hong Kong
Captain John Price (Call of Duty), a fictional character in the Call of Duty series

See also
Jack Price (disambiguation)
Jon Peyton Price, British actor
John Pryce (1828–1903), Welsh clergyman and writer on church history